Gerald Ashton Anderson (22 September 1955 – 9 March 2018) was a Canadian professional golfer.

Anderson was born in Montreal, Quebec and then moved to Cambridge, Ontario.

Anderson played on the European Tour for most of the 1980s. In 1984 he won the Ebel European Masters – Swiss Open, by shooting a 27 under par total of 261, which was a record 72-hole score to par on the European Tour until Ernie Els shot a 29 under par score at the 2003 Johnnie Walker Classic. Anderson finished ninth on the European Tour Order of Merit in 1984, making it into the top fifty. He was a member of the U.S.-based PGA Tour in 1990 and 1992. He represented Canada at the Alfred Dunhill Cup in 1985 and at the World Cup in 1983, 1987, and 1989.  He was inducted into the Ontario Golf Hall of Fame in 2002 and the PGA of Canada Hall of Fame in 2016.

Anderson died in Kitchener, Ontario in 2018 at the age of 62.

Professional wins (11)

European Tour wins (1)

Ben Hogan Tour wins (1)

Ben Hogan Tour playoff record (1–1)

Canadian Tour wins (9)

Results in major championships

CUT = missed the half-way cut
Note: Anderson never played in the Masters Tournament or the PGA Championship.

Canadian national team appearances
Professional
World Cup: 1983, 1987, 1989
Dunhill Cup: 1985

See also
1989 PGA Tour Qualifying School graduates
1991 Ben Hogan Tour graduates

References

External links

Canadian male golfers
European Tour golfers
PGA Tour golfers
Korn Ferry Tour graduates
Golfing people from Quebec
Anglophone Quebec people
Sportspeople from Montreal
1955 births
2018 deaths